Johns Township is one of eighteen townships in Appanoose County, Iowa, United States. As of the 2010 census, its population was 287.

The township's name was selected due to an unusually large percentage of early settlers sharing the name John.

Geography
According to the USGS, it contains five cemeteries: Concord, Crossroads, Garfield, Lyons and Philadelphia.

References

External links
 US-Counties.com
 City-Data.com

Townships in Appanoose County, Iowa
Townships in Iowa